Tandem language learning is a method of language learning based on mutual language exchange between tandem partners, where ideally each learner is a native speaker in the language the other person wants to learn. The tandem language learning experience steps away from the traditional learning pedagogy, removing the teacher-student model. Many language schools in the world, organized as TANDEM International, as well as many universities, implement this approach.

Background
Tandem language learning is available in multiple deliverable teaching practices. The most common type of tandem learning is for both participants to meet in-person, face-to-face (face-to-face tandem). With the emergence of communicative technology in the 1990s, etandem (also called distance tandem) provided a communication bridge via e-mail, allowing partners to practice writing a foreign language. Tele-collaboration places emphasis on cultural integration and intercultural understandings as part of the language-learning process. Within tandem exchanges, language learning takes place in the context of a “reciprocated autonomous” exchange, meaning participants each take part in learning each others’ languages. Time is equally divided so that the exchange of language learning is fairly distributed. For example, a Portuguese speaker and a German speaker can talk for half an hour in German and then for half an hour in Portuguese. In this way, through language exchange partnerships with native speakers, and extra social and cultural experiences, participants become fully immersed in the target language culture. Learning is supported in different ways, for instance, via worksheets, textbooks or simply informal conversation. There are distinct uses of the Tandem method which promote independent learning e.g. Tandem partnerships (two people, supported by counsellors), and Binational Tandem Courses (for groups, organised by moderators). The only condition for participation in self-directed Tandem is to be at a lower intermediate level of language proficiency (lower B1 threshold). The Common European Framework of References for Languages' ( CEFR) Can-Do statements provide a clear description of language ability at the threshold level (B1) in several European languages.

History
"Language learning by exchange" or the "Tandem Approach" is based on various systems of teaching exchange students abroad, such as: partner learning, "peer teaching", tutoring models and "Zweierschaften" (Steinig) or  'one-on-one discipleship'.

The following are some of the most important highlights:
 At the beginning of the 19th century in England, Joseph Lancaster and Andrew Bell instituted the "mutual system" which supplemented large parts of the teacher’s activity at school with pupils’ mutual help. Peter Petersen (German educationalist, 1884–1952) developed something similar in the "Jenaplan schools", and, from 1960 on, similar tutoring models began to appear in the USA.
 The "Tandem" concept for two people learning the same language appeared first in 1971 in connection with the "audio-visual method" of Wambach, and from there it was transferred to binational German-French youth meetings.
 Klaus Lieb-Harkort and Nükhet Cimilli transferred the model to their work with immigrants in the German-Turkish area, in Munich. Courses followed in Bremen, Frankfurt and Zürich.
 In 1979, this inspired Jürgen Wolff to develop the Tandem learning partner mediation, initially for Spanish and German. In 1982 a similar course programme designed by Wolff and his colleagues in Madrid later became the basis for the TANDEM network, later established as the TANDEM schools network.
 Since 1983, the TANDEM model has been adopted as an alternative way of language learning, whose basic elements of language courses abroad, youth exchange, cultural tours, class correspondence and similar cross-border activities are replicated in selective schools throughout Europe. 
 The network cooperates with various educational institutions including the E-Tandem Network, founded in 1992, and renamed the International E-Mail Tandem Network in 1993.
 'TANDEM Fundazioa was founded in 1994 for the development of scientific cooperation and educational and advanced training with their head office in Donostia/San Sebastian, Spain.
 In 2016, Tripod Technology GmbH granted a license from TANDEM Fundazioa to create the Tandem app.
 The majority of the schools under the TANDEM Network established the association 'TANDEM International' with headquarters in Bremen, Germany. Since March 2014, TANDEM International has been the owner of the brand 'TANDEM'.

Benefits

Improvement in language skill

At first, professional discussion primarily centred on the question of the effectiveness of tandem in comparison with traditional language teaching methodologies. This initiated an investigation carried out in 1983 at the Madrid Goethe-Institute, in which tandem pairs, a tandem course and teacher-steered phases were connected with each other and the linguistic progress was compared to a control group, who were also preparing for the 'Zertifikat DaF'. Results showed that the Tandem participants got better results in listening comprehension and speaking skills while they were less successful in reading and writing, even if their performance in the certificate as a whole was just as good as the control group. Another advantage was mutual mistake correction, which was fostered by increased language intake.

Development of intercultural competence

Not only is Tandem concerned with language comprehension and learning, but equally with cultural understanding and knowledge. Accordingly, a critical analysis of the competence component must also examine this second ‘leg’. In fact, it turns out that Tandem aids a change of perspective, with the comparison of one’s own and foreign points of view. Tandem learning exposes the participant to the native speaker's culture naturally providing an inviting informal environment for relaxed engagement. The autonomous nature of language exchange provides the participant to experience different perspectives of world views, which helps shape attitudes of respect, openness, curiosity, and discovery. This is also very helpful during translator training. Moreover, native speakers report an increase of awareness about their own language in the course of the Tandem. Therefore, it seems to be suitable as a ‘confidence booster’ in learning contexts.

Cormier Method 
Devised by Helene Cormier, a language teacher at Club d'échange linguistique de Montréal language school (CELM), the Cormier method is based on instructions in which small groups of learners with different mother tongues interact for in-tandem learning to occur. The participants develop conversations that are aimed to consolidate developed skills in the areas of listening, comprehension, vocabulary and pronunciation.

Participants of this language exchange can experience how native speakers interact through text, voice and video chat. The sessions take about roughly one hour, in which the participants speak in one language for thirty minutes and then switch to the other language for the following thirty minutes. Additionally, through this experience the learners have the chance to learn something from their peers’ culture by using the target language accordingly.

There are five recommendations that should be taken into account in order to develop sessions with the Cormier method. These include:
 Utilising the timer accordingly
 Taking charge of your own learning when speaking in your second language
 Being sensitive to your partners' needs when speaking in your own language
 Not correcting grammar all the time, but striving for communication
 Being considerate to others

Advantages:
 Small focused groups allow all participants to practise and develop close relationships
 Pre-designed lesson plans and engaging activities stimulate participants’ motivation
 Real-time communication with native speakers of your target language is arguably more beneficial than any textbook or pre-recorded media
 Can be accessed anywhere with an adequate internet connection
 Virtual timer manages and allocates time for each participate to practice
Disadvantages:
 Only suitable for intermediate and above levels
 Native speakers may struggle to assist learners’ if they have no teaching background
 Learners from different educational backgrounds and knowledge may hinder communication
 Accessibility in certain countries
 Practice vs Progression  
As this method is primarily for practising, it should not be the main source of language learning and should be seen as a review or a tool that helps learners improve their language learning skills.

Cormier’s method is a simple approach to e-tandem learning that has clearly had success, particularly with the use of Skype. Implementing such a method is possible with relative ease, but there are drawbacks as previously discussed. However, with an abundance of new technologies emerging, different and improved approaches to that of Cormier may have even greater success in the future. These tools could be utilised to incorporate language-learning beginners, as well as improve upon the accessibility to learners in countries where Skype may not be available. Alternative digital tools such as Google Hangouts, Viber, ooVoo, WeChat and many more means that e-tandem learning and telecollaboration will be an area of language learning that continues to grow and prosper.

Drawbacks to tandem language learning 

Tandem language learning is in theory a great idea that reaps various linguistic and cultural benefits. Students of different nationalities can learn from each other for free. However, there are various reasons that may not allow this to work.
 Lack of sufficient amount of foreign students who wish to study a particular minority language (such as Polish, Maltese and others). Even if speakers of minority languages want to learn more popular ones such as English or German, they may find difficulty to find others who are interested in theirs. Minority languages are not very attractive in the world market of foreign languages.
 Participants' expertise: this may involve two factors:

 Insufficient knowledge: Native speakers may lack sufficient knowledge to teach their own language to others. It may also be very challenging and time consuming for students to be methodologically and pedagogically apt to design meaningful learning experiences.
 Error correction: Novice learners speaking in a foreign language during tandem programmes may make mistakes which provoke interruptions from the language experts that aim to correct the error. Such interruptions may hinder the flow of the conversation, disturb the fluency of the novice speaker and produce further foreign language anxieties.

 Task design:  If the online language interaction lacks proper integration within the learning process and the course curriculum, displays no pedagogical leadership and has carelessly designed tasks, the value of tandem language learning can be downplayed by both students and teachers alike.
 Affordances of technology: Technology can sometimes come in the way of successful online intercultural exchanges.  argues that there may be a non - alignment of visual input and output when using certain conferencing technologies such as Skype. Consequently, students will appear to be socially absent from the conversation which will bring about miscommunication. Moreover, the affordances of teleconferencing can undermine actual communication by interrupting the usual process of indicating social presence that includes looking directly at the interlocutor. Hence, if students by mistake signal themselves as socially absent from the other teleconference participants, it can contribute to their exclusion from the conversation.
 Cultural issues: Telles implies that during tandem programmes when comparing cultures, students may share their subjective opinions and reinforce intercultural stereotypes that may create a hostile discourse and interrupt the flow of the conversations. To this end, he suggests that without teacher interventions tele tandem interactions “may fall into shallow performances of sedimented and pre-given representations of self and other”  This tallies with O’ Dowd’s views who sustains that preconceptions of the other learner's culture can affect learners’ proactive attitudes and levels of participation in the exchange.

References

External links

An extensive bibliography on the tandem method

Language education